Al-Shabab Club is an Omani sports club based in Barka, Oman. The club is currently playing in the Oman Professional League, top division of Oman Football Association. Their home ground is Al-Seeb Stadium. The stadium is government owned, but they also own their own personal stadium and sports equipment, as well as their own training facilities.

Being a multisport club
Although being mainly known for their football, Al-Shabab Club like many other clubs in Oman, have not only football in their list, but also hockey, volleyball, handball, basketball, badminton and squash. They also have a youth football team competing in the Omani Youth league.

Colors, kit providers and sponsors
Al-Shabab Club have been known since establishment to wear a full blue or white (Away) kit (usually a darker shade of blue). They have also had many different sponsors over the years. As of now Kelme provides them with kits.

Honours and achievements
Al-Shabab Club – 2014–15 Oman Professional League

National titles
Oman Professional League (2):
Runners-up 2011–12, 2017/2018.

Sultan Qaboos Cup (0):

Oman Professional League Cup (1): 
Winners 2017-18.

Oman Super Cup (0):

UAFA competitions
GCC Champions League: 1 appearance
2012–13 : Group Stage

Personnel

Technical staff

Management

Presidential history
Below is the official presidential history of Al-Shabab Club, from when Sheikh Abdulmoneim Abudllah Al-Farsi took over at the club in 2003, until the present day.

References

External links
Al-Shabab Club Profile at Soccerway.com
Al-Shabab Club Profile at Goalzz.com

Football clubs in Oman
Oman Professional League
Seeb
Association football clubs established in 2003
2003 establishments in Oman